This list of European countries by population comprises the 51 countries and 6 territories and dependencies in Europe, broadly defined, including Cyprus, Kazakhstan, Turkey, and the countries of the Caucasus.

The most populous European country is Russia, with a population of 145 million. Turkey, with a population of 84 million, straddles both Europe and Asia, with most of its population living within its Asian part; though within its territory in Europe, some one-tenth of its population is situated. Excluding Turkey, Germany is the second-most populous country in the continent, with a population of about 84 million.

Table
The ranking here is determined by the given populations, which are the latest available national figures. This list also includes the partially recognized country, Kosovo. For some countries, these are estimates or somewhat out of date, so that the ranking of countries that are very close in population is approximate. The United Nations estimates are those published in the UN's World Population Prospects , which are based on censuses, population registers, surveys, and other statistics.

 Transcontinental countries that straddle Europe and Asia.
 Transcontinental countries with overseas territories outside Europe.
 Countries entirely within Asia that may be considered European because of their political, cultural, and sporting ties with Europe.

See also
List of European countries by area
List of European countries by life expectancy
Area and population of European countries
List of countries by population
List of African countries by population
List of countries in the Americas by population
List of Arab countries by population
List of Asian countries by population
List of Caribbean island countries by population
List of Eurasian countries by population
List of European Union member states by population
List of Latin American countries by population
List of member states of the Commonwealth of Nations by population
List of Middle East countries by population
List of North American countries by population
List of Oceania countries by population
List of South American countries by population
List of countries by past and future population
List of countries by population in 2000
List of countries by population in 2010
List of population concern organizations
List of sovereign states and dependent territories in Europe
List of European countries by population growth rate
List of urban areas of the European Union

Notes

References

Lists of countries by continent
Population
Population
Europe
Europe
Europe